Scared to Death (also known as The Aberdeen Experiment and Scared to Death: Syngenor) is a 1980 American science fiction horror film directed by William Malone and starring John Stinson.

Plot
A monster stalks Los Angeles as a bio-engineered creature called a Syngenor (which stands for SYNthesized GENetic ORganism) and takes refuge in the city's sewer system, going into the streets at night in search of human spinal fluid. The only person who stands in the way of the creature's unstoppable killing spree is Ted Londergan, a former detective turned private investigator. When he is offered a job to look at the case by his former partner, several people on the police force doubt he can help solve it, as he is regarded by many to be a hotshot with a loose temper. As time goes by and the body count begins to mount, Londergan is eventually brought in on the case.

Both the police and the public become astonished by the fact that whoever is committing the murders possesses strength far beyond that of a human, such as being able to rip the doors off cars. When his newfound love interest, Jennifer, is nearly killed by the creature, he experiences a change of heart. After Jennifer is hospitalized after being attacked by the creature, a young woman named Sherry comes forward with information that could help solve the case. She explains to Londergan that Jennifer's missing spinal fluid may mean that it was drained by a creature known as a Syngenor that was being created at a laboratory where she worked. Londergan goes there to investigate and finds the young woman in a state of panic.

They descend into the sewers, where they find the Syngenor's lair and its victims, whom it is harvesting for their spinal fluid. They are pursued by the creature as they flee back into the laboratory, and eventually Londergan's former partner shows up and shoots the creature, causing it to fall back onto a press machine. Sherry then activates the machine, crushing the creature and ending its reign of terror.

Production
Wanting to become a director, Malone decided to make a monster movie because it was the type of film that could give a lot of production value for very little money. He also had experience with monster designs, having previously worked as a designer at a Halloween mask factory so that he could design the monster himself. To raise enough money for the film, Malone had to sell most of his personal belongings, including his, car and mortgage his house. After raising enough money he began building and sculpting the monster suit. Inspired by H.R. Giger's design from the film Alien, he took three months to build the suit. During this process, he began casting the film and originally cast the actor and pop star Rick Springfield in the lead role. Springfield, however, called Malone the night before filming began saying he could not be in the film because he would miss too many acting classes. Malone then called the actor John Stinson, who he remembered from an improvisation class, and begged him to be in the film, to which he agreed. Filming began in February 1979 and the shoot lasted four weeks, a rather long time for a low-budget film.

Lone Star Pictures, a Texas-based company, provided $40,000 for the budget and picked up worldwide distribution. After the premier, the first sale made by Lone Star was to Malaysia for $90,000, putting the film into profit since it only cost $74,000 to make.

Release
The film was first released by Lone Star Pictures International Inc. in all worldwide markets.

Home media
The film was released on VHS by Media Home Entertainment in the 1980s, and on DVD by Retromedia Entertainment in 2010. The title on the box art was changed to Scared to Death: Syngenor to show a connection to the film's 1990 sequel Syngenor.

References

External links 
 
 

1980 horror films
1980 films
1980s science fiction horror films
American science fiction horror films
Films directed by William Malone
1980 directorial debut films
1980s English-language films
1980s American films